The Diocese of Saskatoon is a diocese of the Ecclesiastical Province of Rupert's Land of the Anglican Church of Canada. Its territory is a band across the middle of the province of Saskatchewan. It was separated from the Anglican Diocese of Saskatchewan in 1933. The motto of the diocese is Sursum Corda - Lift up your hearts, a phrase from the service of Holy Communion. The cathedral church is St.John the Evangelist, built in 1912. Like many main line churches, the diocese continues to close parishes and churches, both rural and urban, and is serving an aging population. Many rural parishes are multi-point charges.

Bishops of Saskatoon
Previous bishops were bishops of Anglican Diocese of Saskatchewan, Bishop Hallam continued after 1933 as bishop of Saskatoon.
1931 William Hallam (Bishop of Saskatchewan until 1933 diocesan split)
1949 Wilfred Fuller
1950 Stanley Steer
1970 Douglas Ford
1981 Roland Wood
1993 Tom Morgan (also Metropolitan of Rupert's Land, 2000–2003)
2004 Rod Andrews
2010 David Irving
2018 Chris Harper

Deans of Saskatoon
The Dean of Saskatoon is also Rector of St John's Cathedral.

Source: 

1943–1949: William Eastland Fuller (Bishop of Saskatoon, 1949)
1950–1955: Norman Douglas Larmouth
1956–1962: Shirley Arthur Ralph Wood
1962–1965: Elwood Harold Patterson
1966–1970: Douglas Albert Ford (Bishop of Saskatoon, 1970)
1971–1981: Roland Wood (Bishop of Saskatoon, 1981)
1982–1991: Robert J. Blackwell
1993–2000: John Allan Kirk
2001–2006: Susan Marie Charbonneau
2006–2011: Terry R. Wiebe
2012–2022: G. Scott Pittendrigh

References

Saskatoon, Anglican Diocese of
 
1933 establishments in Saskatchewan
Anglican Province of Rupert's Land